The 2011 season is FC Seoul's 28th season in the K League Classic.

Pre-season
 In Namhae, South Korea: From 10 January 2011 to 31 January 2011 
 In Kagoshima, Japan: From 6 February 2011 to 18 February 2011

Pre-season match results

Competitions

Overview

K League

League table

Results summary

Results by round

Matches

K League Championship

FA Cup

League Cup

AFC Champions League

Group stage

Knockout stage

Match reports and match highlights
Fixtures and Results at FC Seoul Official Website

Season statistics

K League records

K League Championship records

All competitions records

Attendance records

 Season total attendance is K League Regular Season, League Cup, FA Cup, AFC Champions League in the aggregate and friendly match attendance is not included.
 K League season total attendance is K League Regular Season and League Cup in the aggregate.

Squad statistics

Appearances and goals
Statistics accurate as of match played 19 November 2011

Goals

Assists

Coaching staff

Players

Team squad
All players registered for the 2011 season are listed.

 
(Out)

(Out)

(Out)
(Out)
(Conscripted)
(Conscripted)

(Out)

Out on loan & military service

 In : Transferred from other teams in the middle of season.
 Out : Transferred to other teams in the middle of season.
 Discharged : Transferred from Sangju Sangmu and Police FC for military service in the middle of season. (Registered in 2011 season)
 Conscripted : Transferred to Sangju Sangmu and Police FC for military service after end of season.

Transfers

In

Rookie Draft 

 (Univ.) means player who go to university then back to FC Seoul.
 (After Univ.) means player who is joined FC Seoul after entering university.

Out

Loan & Military service

Tactics

Tactical analysis

Starting eleven and formation 
This section shows the most used players for each position considering a 4-4-2 formation.

Substitutes

See also
 FC Seoul

References

 FC Seoul 2011 Matchday Magazines

External links
 FC Seoul Official Website 

FC Seoul seasons
Seoul